Brijendra Kala is an Indian actor who works in Bollywood films. He is known for his subtle portrayals of characters rooted in reality. He gained attention for his small roles in mainstream cinema.

Early life 
Kala spent his childhood in Mathura, Uttar Pradesh where his father worked in a veterinary hospital. His family belongs to Pauri, Garhwal in Uttarakhand.

Career
He wrote the dialogues for several TV shows produced by Ekta Kapoor, including Kahaani Ghar Ghar Kii. His acting debut was in 2003, when Tigmanshu Dhulia cast him in a small role as a newspaper vendor in Haasil.

Kala has had minor or supporting roles in films such as Jab We Met, Mithya, Agneepath, Paan Singh Tomar, Ankhon Dekhi, PK, Tubelight and Batti Gul Meter Chalu, and has played a range of different characters, specialising in comedic portrayals.

Filmography

Films

Web series

References

External links
 

Living people
Indian male film actors
Male actors in Hindi cinema
21st-century Indian male actors
Year of birth missing (living people)
Place of birth missing (living people)
People from Mathura